Maer is a rural village and civil parish in the Borough of Newcastle-under-Lyme, Staffordshire, England, to the west of the pottery manufacturing town of Stoke-on-Trent.

Its main feature is the large 17th-century stone-built country house, Maer Hall, built on a slope above a small lake, or "mere", which gave the house and estate its name. The hall became the home of Josiah Wedgwood II and was frequently visited by his nephew Charles Darwin, who went on to marry Josiah's daughter Emma at St. Peter's Church, which stands higher on the hillside, close to the hall. When she was young, Emma helped her older sister Elizabeth with the Sunday School, which was held in Maer Hall laundry, giving sixty village children their only formal training in reading, writing and religion. The grave of Josiah Wedgwood II and his wife Elizabeth in the churchyard has a view down over the hall.

Nearby is Berth Hill, an Iron Age hillfort.

See also
Listed buildings in Maer, Staffordshire

References

External links 
 
 Details
 GENUKI page

Villages in Staffordshire
Borough of Newcastle-under-Lyme